The Skookum WCT Cash Spiel was an annual bonspiel, or curling tournament, that took place at the Whitehorse Curling Club in Whitehorse, Yukon. The tournament was held in a round-robin format. The tournament, sponsored by Skookum Asphalt, ran from 2006 to 2010 and was a major event on the World Curling Tour. Curlers from Alberta dominated the event, with Albertan teams winning 4 of the 5 events.

Past champions
Only skip's name is displayed.

References

External links
Whitehorse Curling Club Home

Former World Curling Tour events
Curling competitions in Canada
Curling in Yukon
Sport in Whitehorse
2006 establishments in Canada
2010 disestablishments in Canada
Recurring sporting events established in 2006